Incisa may refer to:

Places of Italy
Incisa Scapaccino (originally Incisa Belbo), a municipality in the province of Asti.
Incisa in Val d'Arno, a municipality in the province of Florence.
Marquisate of Incisa (1161-1548), a lordship aleramica of Piedmont

People
Oddone d'Incisa (1450/60-1514), Italian aleramic marquess
Stefano Giuseppe Incisa (1742-1819), Italian canon and historian